The Philippines participated in the 1970 Asian Games held in Bangkok, Thailand from August 24 to September 4, 1970. Ranked 11th with 1 gold medal, 9 silver medals and 12 bronze medals with a total of 22 over-all medals.

Asian Games performance
A win by bantamweight boxer Ricardo Fortaleza was the lone gold medal for the 76-man contingent that competed in eight sports.

Medalists

The following Philippine competitors won medals at the Games.

Gold

Silver

Bronze

Multiple

Medal summary

Medals by sports

References

Nations at the 1970 Asian Games
1970
Asian Games